Deh Shaib may refer to:
 Deh Shaib-e Olya
 Deh Shaib-e Sofla